Hasan Helimisi was a Georgian painter and poet of Laz origin.

References

External links 
 Helimişi Xasanişi Skidala

Laz people
1907 births
1976 deaths
20th-century painters
20th-century painters from Georgia (country)
Painters from the Russian Empire
Modern artists
Emigrants from the Ottoman Empire to the Russian Empire